Ernestine Spitzer (22 April 1836 – 13 March 1897) was an Austrian fashion businessperson. She was the founder of the fashion house G. & E. Spitzer in Vienna.

References 

1836 births
1897 deaths
19th-century Austrian businesspeople
19th-century businesswomen